Belt wrestling was contested at the 2013 Summer Universiade from July 6 to 9 at the Ak Bars Wrestling Palace in Kazan, Russia. Belt wrestling will be making its debut at the 2013 Summer Universiade.

Medal summary

Medal table

Men's events

Classic style

Freestyle

Women's events

Freestyle

See also
2013 in wrestling

References

External links
2013 Summer Universiade – Belt wrestling
Results book

2013 Summer Universiade events
2013 in sport wrestling